Chichigalpa is a town and municipality in the Chinandega Department of Nicaragua.

History

Pre-Columbian
It is presumed that Chichigalpa's first inhabitants arrived from the north. While their civilizations were not as advanced as those of the Aztecs and the Incans, they arrived at Chichigalpa due to a forced migration instituted by the Aztecs on weaker tribes. Of Toltec origin, the native people of Chichigalpa were the Niquiranos and Chorotegas.

Colonial Period

Geography

Area
The municipality covers an area of 223 km2, but only about 3.5 km2 make up the center of the municipality and its nearby surroundings. Chichigalpa is connected to the city of Chinandega by a paved road (15 km). The municipality connects to the Nicaraguan capital, Managua, through the Pan-American Highway. Chichigalpa forms part of the Western department of Chinandega. It is bordered to the north by the Cordillera Los Maribios (a mountain range), to the south by León, to the east by Posoltega, and to the west by the municipalities of El Realejo and Chinandega.

Climate
Chichigalpa is situated in tropical wet and dry climate (Köppen climate classification: Aw). The dry season last from November to April while the wet season extends from May to October. The average annual precipitation is of 1742 mm (68.58 in). Temperatures are usually the highest in the month of April. The average temperature is 30 °C (89 °F). Relative humidity is 68% and strong winds blow in a northeast to south direction predominantly.

Today

Sugarcane
Sugar accounts from about 5% of Nicaragua’s GDP and the municipality of Chichigalpa has vast areas of sugarcane plantations. A large number of the sugar cane workers have been affected with a chronic kidney disease (CKD). There is a growing scientific view that CKD is linked to harsh work conditions, particularly long hours exposed to sun without sufficient shade, rest and water. Dr Catharina Wesseling, an epidemiologist based at the Karolinska Institute in Sweden said that while other factors - such as pesticides, heavy metals and genetics – could also play a part, there was “absolutely no doubt” that CKD was an occupational disease.

Neighborhoods (Comarcas)
The municipality is further divided into many neighborhoods (Comarcas):

 Candelaria
 Camino de Jesús
 Carlos Fonseca I, II
 Concepción
 El Pueblito
 Erick Ramirez
 Juan Jose Briceño
 La Parroquia
 La Cruz
 Las Palmeras
 Los Lirios
 Mercedes
 Marvin Salazar I, II, III
 Modesto Ramón Palma
 Nueva Candelaria
 Nuevo Amanecer
 Quetzalia
 Ronald Altamirano II
 Reparto. 13 de Julio
 Santiago
 San Antonio
 Valle Viejo I, II
 Wells

References

External links
 Mi Chichigalpa.com

Bibliography
Historia del Municipio de Chichigalpa, 2000
Sinopsis Histórica de Chichigalpa
  

Municipalities of the Chinandega Department